The Roman Catholic Diocese of Chascomús is in Argentina and is a suffragan of the Archdiocese of La Plata.

History
On 27 March 1980, Blessed John Paul II established the Diocese of Chascomús from the Archdiocese of La Plata and the Diocese of Mar del Plata.

Ordinaries
Rodolfo Bufano † (1980–1982, appointed bishop of San Justo)
José María Montes † (1983–1996, retired) 
Juan Carlos Maccarone † (1996–1999, appointed bishop of Santiago del Estero) 
Carlos Humberto Malfa (2000)

References

Roman Catholic dioceses in Argentina
Roman Catholic Ecclesiastical Province of La Plata
Christian organizations established in 1980
Roman Catholic dioceses and prelatures established in the 20th century